Menorca or Minorca (from , later Minorica) is one of the Balearic Islands located in the Mediterranean Sea belonging to Spain. Its name derives from its size, contrasting it with nearby Majorca. Its capital is Mahón, situated on the island's eastern end, although Menorca is not a province and forms a political union with the other islands in the archipelago. Ciutadella and Mahon are the main ports and largest towns. The port of Mahon is the second biggest natural port in the world.

Menorca has a population of approximately 93,397 (at 1 January 2019).

History 

The island is known for its collection of megalithic stone monuments: navetes, taules and talaiots, which indicate very early prehistoric human activity. Some of the earliest culture on Menorca was influenced by other Mediterranean cultures, including the Greek Minoans of ancient Crete (see also Gymnesian Islands). For example, the use of inverted plastered timber columns at Knossos is thought to have influenced early peoples of Menorca in imitating this practice.

The end of the Punic wars saw an increase in piracy in the western Mediterranean. The Roman occupation of Hispania had meant a growth of maritime trade between the Iberian and Italian peninsulas. Pirates took advantage of the strategic location of the Balearic Islands to raid Roman commerce, using both Menorca and Majorca as bases. In reaction to this, the Romans invaded Menorca. By 123 BC both islands were fully under Roman control, later being incorporated into the province of Hispania Citerior.

In 13 BC Roman emperor Augustus reorganised the provincial system and the Balearic Islands became part of the Tarraconensis imperial province. The ancient town of Mago was transformed from a Carthaginian town to a Roman town.

Jews of Menorca

The island had a Jewish population. The Letter on the Conversion of the Jews by a fifth-century bishop named Severus tells of the forced conversion of the island's 540 Jewish men and women in AD 418. Several Jews, including Theodore, a rich representative Jew who stood high in the estimation of his coreligionists and of Christians alike, underwent baptism. The act of conversion brought about, within a previously peaceful coexisting community, the expulsion of the ruling Jewish elite into the bleak hinterlands, the burning of synagogues, and the gradual reinstatement of certain Jewish families after the forced acceptance of Christianity, allowing the survival of those Jewish families who had not already perished. Many Jews remained within the Jewish faith while outwardly professing Christian faith. Some of these Jews form part of the Xueta community.

When Menorca became a British possession in 1713, they actively encouraged the immigration of foreign non-Catholics, which included Jews who were not accepted by the predominantly Christian inhabitants. When the Jewish community in Mahon requested the use of a room as a synagogue, their request was refused, and they were denounced by the clergy. In 1781, when Louis des Balbes de Berton de Crillon, duc de Mahon invaded Menorca, he ordered all Jews to leave in four days. At that time, the Jewish community consisted of about 500 people and they were transported from Menorca in four Spanish ships to the port of Marseille.

Middle Ages 

The Vandals easily conquered the island in the fifth century. The Byzantine Empire recovered it in 534. Following the Umayyad conquest of Hispania, Menorca was annexed to the Caliphate of Córdoba in 903, with many Muslims emigrating to the island.

Manûrqa was the Arabicized name given to the island by the Muslims from its annexation to the Caliphate of Cordoba by 'Isâm al-Khawlânî in 903 until the rule of the last Muslim ra'îs, Abû 'Umar ibn Sa'îd in 1287. The only urban centre of the island was Madînat al Jazîra or al Manûrqa (modern Ciutadella). Most of the population lived in small farm communities organized under a tribal structure.

In 1231, after Christian forces took Majorca, Menorca chose to become an independent Islamic state, albeit one tributary to King James I of Aragon. The island was ruled first by Abû 'Uthmân Sa'îd Hakam al Qurashi (1234–1282), and following his death by his son, Abû 'Umar ibn Sa'îd (1282–1287).

A Catalan-Aragonese invasion, led by Alfonso III (also known as Count of Barcelona Alfons II), came on 17 January 1287; its anniversary is now celebrated as Menorca's national day. Once the island was captured, most of its Muslim inhabitants were enslaved and sold in the slave markets of Eivissa, Valencia and Barcelona, while others became Christians.

After the Christian conquest of 1287, the island was part of the Crown of Aragon. For some time it was ceded to the Kingdom of Majorca, a vassal state of the Crown, but it was retaken by the king of Aragon in 1343. Eventually the Crown of Aragon merged with the Crown of Castile, and so Menorca became part of Spain.

During the 16th century, Turkish naval attacks destroyed Mahon, and the then capital, Ciutadella. In Mahon, Barbary pirates from North Africa took considerable booty and as many as 6,000 slaves. Various Spanish kings, including Philip III and Philip IV, styled themselves "King of Minorca" as a subsidiary title.

18th-19th centuries 

Captured by Britain's Royal Navy in 1708 during the War of the Spanish Succession, Minorca temporarily became a British possession. Great Britain took possession in 1713, under the terms of Article XI of the Treaty of Utrecht. Under the governorship of General Richard Kane, this period saw the island's capital moved to Port Mahon and a naval base established in that town's harbour.

In 1756, during the Seven Years' War, France captured the island after the Siege of Fort St Philip and a failed British relief attempt. The 1763 Treaty of Paris enabled the British to return to the island after Britain's victory in the Seven Years' War.  In 1781, during the American War of Independence, the British were defeated for a second time, in this instance by a combination of French and Spanish forces, and on 5 January 1782 the Spanish regained control of the island, after a long siege of St. Philip's Castle in Port Mahon. The British ceded the island back to Spain the next year in the Treaty of Versailles. Menorca was invaded by the British once again in 1798, during the French Revolutionary Wars, but it was finally repossessed by Spain by the terms of the Treaty of Amiens in 1802. The British influence can still be seen in local architecture, with elements such as sash windows.

As with the rest of the Balearic Islands, Menorca was not occupied by the French during the Peninsular War, as it was successfully protected by the Royal Navy, this time allied to Spain.

From 1815 until the mid-century, the U.S. Navy developed its Mediterranean headquarters at Port Mahon, leaving behind the English Cemetery, Menorca, which was restored by the Spanish government in 2008 and is maintained in the 21st century.

Since 1900
During the Spanish Civil War, Menorca stayed loyal to the Republican Spanish Government, while the rest of the Balearic Islands supported the Spanish Nationalists. The island did not see ground combat, but it was a target of aerial bombing by the pro-Nationalist Italians of the Corpo Truppe Volontarie Air Force. Many Menorcans were also killed when taking part in a failed invasion of Majorca. During the Pedro Marqués Barber era (July–December 1936) some Mallorcans and a priest were executed on the island. After the Nationalist victory in the Battle of Minorca in February 1939, the British Navy assisted in a peaceful transfer of power in Menorca and the evacuation of some political refugees aboard .

In October 1993, Menorca was designated by UNESCO as a biosphere reserve. In July 2005, the island's application to become the 25th member of the International Island Games Association was approved.

Climate 
As the major part of Balearic Islands, Menorca has a mediterranean climate (Köppen: Csa), with mild winters and hot summers. Menorca is generally wetter than Mallorca, with rainfall peaking in late autumn. Due to its offshore position and the small size of the island, temperatures are generally quite stable.

Culture 

The location of Minorca in the middle of the western Mediterranean was a staging point for the different cultures since prehistoric times. This Balearic Island has a mix of colonial and local architecture.

The festes take place throughout the summer in different towns around the island, and have their origins in the early 14th century. The international opera week and international organ festival in Mahon, and the summer music festival and Capella Davidica concerts in Ciutadella are the main events of the island.

Minorca's cuisine is dominated by the Mediterranean diet which is known to be very healthy. While many of the locals have adopted modern attitudes they still uphold certain old traditions.

Traditional celebrations 

Minorca is especially well known for its traditional summer "festes", which intrigue many visitors. The Saint John's Feast is held annually in Ciutadella de Menorca, during 23–25 June. The festes last for three days. On the first day, a man bears a well-groomed sheep upon his shoulders and parades around the local streets. In the late evening, main streets are closed, and bonfires held upon them.

On the second day, locally bred black horses are dressed with ribbons and rosettes. The riders, or "caixers", ride the horses through the streets and, along with a tumultuous crowd of people, encourage them to rear up on their hind legs. The brave can be found running underneath them in an attempt to touch the horses hearts for good luck. 

The third day sees intense competition between the riders in a harmless form of jousting that involves spearing a suspended ring with a lance at considerable speed. The festes are brought to a close with a firework display.

Sports 
As a small island, Menorca offers limited opportunities to see top-level sport competitions in. Football in Menorca is played at the fifth level of the Spanish football pyramid. There are currently 11 clubs contesting the Regional Preferente de Menorca, the champion of which progresses to the Tercera División Grupo XI playoffs. The winner of this playoff is promoted to Tercera División; the last Menorquí club to do so was CF Sporting Mahonés in 2009.

CV Ciutadella are a professional women's volleyball club who play in the Superliga Femenina, the top league of Spanish volleyball, having won the league championship in 2011 and 2012. They play at Pavelló Municipal d'Esports in Ciutadella.

A semi-pro basketball club, CB Menorca, play in the LEB Plata, the third level of Spanish basketball. Their home court is Pavelló Menorca in the Bintaufa neighborhood just outside of Maó.

In recent years, some sport events that gather hundreds of participants are successfully held on a yearly basis, such as the triathlon race Extreme Man Menorca or the single-staged ultramarathon race Trail Menorca Camí de Cavalls. In 2014, it was announced that the island would host the 18th editions of the Island Games in 2019, however, Menorca later pulled out of hosting the event, citing a change of government as the main reason.

Language 

The two official languages are Catalan and Spanish. Natives to the island speak the variety of Catalan called Menorquí, and Spanish as well; many residents originating from the mainland are monolingual in Spanish. The language of education and of government is Catalan, with Spanish taught alongside it.

A 2014 survey carried out by the Government of the Balearic Islands found that 53.5% of participants identified themselves as Catalan speakers, 36.7% as Spanish speakers, and 7.7% as bilingual speakers.

The Catalan spoken in Menorca is a variety known as Menorquí. Between Menorquí and standard Catalan, as with most Balearic dialects, the most distinctive difference is the word used for the article "the", where Menorquí uses "es" for masculine and "sa" for feminine. Menorquí thus shares the source of its article with many Sardinian varieties (masc. sing. su, fem sing. sa), rather than the standard Catalan "el" and "la", similar to other Romance languages (e.g. Spanish el, la, Italian il, la), corresponding to a form which was historically used along the Costa Brava of Catalonia, from where it is supposed that the islands were repopulated after being conquered from the Moors.

Menorquí also has a few English loan words dating back to the period of British rule, such as "grevi", "xumaquer", "boinder" and "xoc" taken from "gravy", "shoemaker", "bow window" and "chalk", respectively.

Food and drink 

Wine production has been known on the island since ancient times, but it went into a heavy decline over the last century. Now, several new, small wineries have started up, producing wines locally.

Lingering British influence is seen in the Menorcans' taste for gin, which during local festes honoring towns' patron saints is mixed with lemonade (or bitter lemon) to make a golden liquid known as Pomada. Gin from Menorca is not derived from grain alcohol but from wine alcohol (eau de vie de vin), making it more akin to brandy. It has the distinction to have geographical identity protection. Probably the best known gin is Gin Xoriguer which is named after the typical Menorcan windmill which was used to make the first gin. One of the reasons it is also known as Gin de Minorca or Gin de Mahón.

Also famous is Mahón cheese, "formatge de Maó", a cheese typical of the island.

One origin story of mayonnaise is that it was brought back to France from Mahon, Menorca, after Louis-François-Armand du Plessis de Richelieu's victory over the British at the city's port in 1756.

Sweets known as flaons are one of the typical gastronomic products of Menorca.

Wildlife

Flowers
Menorca is rich in wild flowers with over 900 species of flowering plants recorded. Many are those typical of the Mediterranean, but some are endemic. There are 24 or 25 species of orchid found and of these most flower early in the year in late March, April and May.

Insects

30 species of butterflies have been recorded on Menorca and most are on the wing from March to late September. The species that occur include the Cleopatra, Lang's short tailed blue and the two-tailed pasha.

Despite not having many large wetlands dragonflies abound on Menorca. Seventeen species have been recorded including the emperor dragonfly.
List of butterflies of Menorca
List of dragonflies of Menorca

Reptiles and amphibians
There are three species of amphibia: green toad (Bufo viridis), marsh frog and stripeless tree frog (Hyla meridionalis).
The common lizard seen all over the island is the Italian wall lizard (Podarcis siculus) although the Moroccan rock lizard (Scelaris perspicillata) also occurs. The Balearic endemic Lilford's wall lizard (Podarcis lilfordi) can be found on many of the offshore islands. Two species of gecko can be found on Menorca, the Moorish (Tarentola mauritanica) and the Turkish (Hemidactylus turcicus) also called the Mediterranean house gecko.
Four species of snake occur: the viperine snake (Natrix maura), grass snake, false smooth snake (Macroprotodon cucullatus) and the ladder snake (Rhinechis scalaris).

Hermann's tortoise (Testudo hermanni) is quite common and can be found all over the island. Two terrapin species are also found, the native European pond terrapin (Emys orbicularis) and the introduced American red-eared slider (Trachemys scripta).

Birds
The birdlife of Menorca is very well known. Menorca is a well watched island which is on the migration route of many species and good number of passage migrants can be seen in spring. Residents include Audouin's gull, blue rock thrush and Thekla lark. Booted eagle and red kite are easy to see as is Egyptian vulture in the right habitat. In summer there are bee-eaters and Menorca has major colonies of Cory's shearwater and Balearic shearwater.

Mammals
Menorca has no large native mammals. There are some small mammals including rabbits, bats, rats, mice, pine martens and a subspecies of North African hedgehog.

Municipalities 

The major towns are Port Mahon and Ciutadella de Menorca. The island is administratively divided into eight municipalities (from west to east):
Ciutadella de Menorca (or just Ciutadella locally) – the ancient capital of Menorca until 1722.
Ferreries
Es Mercadal
Fornells, which belongs to the municipality of Es Mercadal. Famous for its lobster stew (caldereta). 
Es Migjorn Gran (or Es Mitjorn Gran) – hometown of Joan Riudavets.
Alaior
Cala En Porter – a tourist and residential area
Port Mahon (officially Maó in Catalan, Mahón in Spanish) – became the capital in 1722 during British rule due to its strategic natural harbour.
Llucmassanes – a small hamlet which belongs to the municipality of Maó.
Sant Climent, which belongs to the municipality of Maó.
Es Castell – Founded by the British and originally named as Georgetown.
Sant Lluís – Founded by the French and originally named Saint-Louis.

The areas and populations of the municipalities (according to the Instituto Nacional de Estadística, Spain) are:

Transport 
Me-1 road (Spain)

Gallery

See also 
 Gymnesian Islands
 Illa de l'Aire
 List of butterflies of Menorca
 List of dragonflies of Menorca
 Menorca Airport
 Menorca Sun
 Roman Catholic Diocese of Menorca

Notes

References

Further reading 
 Burns, Robert I., (1990) "Muslims in the Thirteenth Century Realms of Aragon: Interaction and Reaction", p. 67, In: Powell, J.M. (ed.) Muslims under Latin Rule, 1100–1300, p. 57–102, Princeton University Press. .
 Fernandez-Arnesto, F. Before Columbus: Exploration and Colonisation from the Mediterranean to the Atlantic 1229–1492; Mac Millan, 1987. p. 36.* Hearl, G., (1996). A Birdwatchers guide to Minorca, Ibiza and Formentera. Arlequin Press. pp56. 
 Carlo Ginzburg, "The Conversion of the Jews of Minorca (A.D. 417–418)," in Idem, Threads and Traces: True False Fictive (Berkeley, University of California Press, 2011)
 Moll Mercadal, B. Abû 'Uthmân Sa'îd ibn Hakam, Ra'îs de Manûrqa (631/1234-680/1289) Publicacions des Born nº5. 1999
 Pons, G., (2000). Les papallones diurnes de les balears., pp87. Edicions Documenta Balear, Palma de Mallorca.
 Taylor, David Wilson (1975). Minorca.   (Great Britain)    (United States) First full account of Minorca in English since John Armstrong's memoirs of 1740. 
Laurie, John Bruce (1994) The Life of Richard Kane, Britain's First Lieutenant-Governor of Menorca

External links 

 UNESCO's Minorca Biosphere Reserve
Manûrqa's society at the Ecomuseum Cap de Cavalleria of Menorca

 
1708 establishments in the British Empire
Biosphere reserves of Spain
Former British colonies and protectorates in Europe
Islands of the Balearic Islands
Mediterranean islands